Edwyn Francis Scudamore-Stanhope, 10th Earl of Chesterfield,  (15 March 1854 – 24 January 1933), styled Lord Stanhope between 1883 and 1887, was a British peer and courtier.

Background and education
Scudamore-Stanhope was the eldest child of Henry Scudamore-Stanhope, 9th Earl of Chesterfield, by Dorothea Hay, daughter of Sir Adam Hay, 7th Baronet. He was educated at Eton and Brasenose College, Oxford, where he graduated in 1877 with a BA. He was a practising barrister in 1877.

Political career
Scudamore-Stanhope was Assistant Private Secretary to the Chancellor of the Exchequer in 1886. The following year he took his seat in the House of Lords on the death of his father. He served under William Ewart Gladstone as Treasurer of the Household between 1892 and 1894 and under Lord Rosebery as Captain of the Honourable Corps of Gentlemen at Arms between 1894 and 1895, and was sworn of the Privy Council on 30 April 1894. He was later Lord Steward of the Household under H. H. Asquith from 1910 to 1915 and Master of the Horse under Asquith and then David Lloyd George between 1915 and 1922. He was invested as a Knight of the Garter on 1 January 1915.

Family
Lord Chesterfield married the Hon. Enid Edith Wilson, second daughter of Charles Wilson, 1st Baron Nunburnholme, on 15 February 1900 at St. Mark's Church, North Audley Street, Mayfair, London. They lived initially at Holme Lacy House, the Stanhope seat in Herefordshire, which the Earl had inherited from his father, but which he sold in 1909, having previously sold the contents in 1902. They lived afterwards at Beningbrough Hall in Yorkshire, a property which her father bought for the couple as a belated wedding present. They did not have any children.

Lord Chesterfield died in London on 24 January 1933, aged 78 and was buried in the Church of St Cuthbert in Holme Lacy, Herefordshire. Having no heirs, his titles were inherited by his younger brother, Henry.

References

External links

Knights of the Garter
Knights Grand Cross of the Royal Victorian Order
Members of the Privy Council of the United Kingdom
1854 births
1933 deaths
People educated at Eton College
Alumni of Brasenose College, Oxford
Treasurers of the Household
Honourable Corps of Gentlemen at Arms
Edwyn
Presidents of the Marylebone Cricket Club
Earls of Chesterfield